Squalius torgalensis is a species of freshwater fish in the family Cyprinidae, growing to  SL. It is found only in the Mira River basin in southern Portugal. Its natural habitats are rivers and intermittent rivers. It is threatened by habitat loss.

References

Squalius
Freshwater fish of Europe
Endemic fauna of Portugal
Fish described in 1998
Taxonomy articles created by Polbot